Tianping rolling stock depot is the rolling stock depot of Line 1, Suzhou Rail Transit. It is located in Tianping Village, Mudu Town, Wuzhong District, Suzhou. The depot opens to public occasionally.

References

Suzhou Rail Transit
Railway depots in China